Hudson is a city in Black Hawk County, Iowa, United States. The population was 2,546 at the time of the 2020 census.  The rural community of Hudson has grown in recent years and is included as a part of the Waterloo-Cedar Falls Metropolitan Statistical Area.

History
Hudson was platted in 1857.

Geography
Hudson is located at  (42.408794, -92.452111).

U.S. Route 63 and Iowa Highway 58 meet just south of Hudson's center. U.S. Route 20 follows a path north of the town.

Demographics

2010 census
As of the census of 2010, there were 2,282 people, 878 households, and 688 families living in the city. The racial makeup of the city was 98.1% White, 0.3% African American, 0.5% Asian, 0.7% from other races, and 0.4% from two or more races. Hispanic or Latino of any race were 1.6% of the population.

There were 878 households, of which 35.5% had children under the age of 18 living with them, 68.2% were married couples living together, 6.8% had a female householder with no husband present, 3.3% had a male householder with no wife present, and 21.6% were non-families. 18.5% of all households were made up of individuals, and 7.9% had someone living alone who was 65 years of age or older. The average household size was 2.60 and the average family size was 2.94.

The median age in the city was 41.7 years. 26.1% of residents were under the age of 18; 5.9% were between the ages of 18 and 24; 23.5% were from 25 to 44; 30.3% were from 45 to 64; and 14.4% were 65 years of age or older. The gender makeup of the city was 49.3% male and 50.7% female.

2000 census
As of the census of 2000, there were 2,117 people, 787 households, and 613 families living in the city. The racial makeup of the city was 98.49% White, 0.19% African American, 0.43% Asian, 0.66% from other races, and 0.24% from two or more races. Hispanic or Latino of any race were 0.71% of the population.

There were 787 households, out of which 39.5% had children under the age of 18 living with them, 69.6% were married couples living together, 6.2% had a female householder with no husband present, and 22.1% were non-families. 19.2% of all households were made up of individuals, and 9.7% had someone living alone who was 65 years of age or older. The average household size was 2.69 and the average family size was 3.10.

Age spread: 28.9% under the age of 18, 6.8% from 18 to 24, 26.6% from 25 to 44, 26.2% from 45 to 64, and 11.4% who were 65 years of age or older. The median age was 38 years. For every 100 females, there were 93.5 males. For every 100 females age 18 and over, there were 92.6 males.

The median income for a household in the city was $56,065, and the median income for a family was $64,737. Males had a median income of $41,576 versus $26,667 for females. The per capita income for the city was $24,101. About 1.9% of families and 3.3% of the population were below the poverty line, including 5.1% of those under age 18 and 3.3% of those age 65 or over.

References

External links

 
City of Hudson official website
Hudson Community School
City Data Comprehensive Statistical Data and more about Hudson
Hudson Public Library

Cities in Black Hawk County, Iowa
Cities in Iowa
Waterloo – Cedar Falls metropolitan area
1857 establishments in Iowa
Populated places established in 1857